Rijan Nabaz better known by his stage name Node (born 3 March 1990) is a Danish-Kurdish singer and rapper.

He started in 2012 as a pop singer under the mononym Rijan releasing his song "Ligeglad". Very early on he recorded also the song "Farvel" that featured also the rapper Gilli accompanied with a music video and rap sequence by Gilli. The video enjoyed 500,000 views. He followed it up by "I mit hovede" also credited as Rajin.

He gained fame in 2017 through streaming of materials through Danish artist on Spotify. His music is characterized by a mix of Middle Eastern pop music, dancehall rhythms, rhythm and blues and hip-hop with urban lyrics about urban life. He is signed to Sony Music Denmark.

His breakthrough came when he released the singles "Zebah" and "Pakker Bar" that charted on Hitlisten, the Danish Singles Chart. The follow-up "De Snakker" featuring Stepz of MellemFingaMuzik reached #2 on the Danish Singles Chart. He has released Cambiarme in 2018 that topped the Danish Albums Chart, followed by Samme vej that made it to #2 on the same chart. Samme vej includes collaborations with Burhan G, Stepz, Post Malone and Rasmus Seebach. Number one hits involve "Oui" as the trio Sivas, Node and Gilli and "Super Mario". He has widely collaborated with Danish rapper Gilli with him he has charted multiple times, like "Zebah" in 2016, "Carnalismo" in 2018 and "Limbo" in 2020. Node was nominated for "Danish Newcomer of the Year" during the Danish Music Awards in 2017.

Discography

Albums

Singles

Featured in

Other songs

References

External links
Node YouTube channel

Danish male singers
Danish rappers
1990 births
Living people
Danish people of Kurdish descent